The 72nd Texas Legislature met from January 8, 1991, to May 27, 1991, and in four subsequent special called sessions. All members present during this session were elected in the 1990 general elections.

Sessions

Regular Session: January 8, 1991 - May 27, 1991
1st Called Session: July 15, 1991 - August 13, 1991
2nd Called Session: August 19, 1991 - August 25, 1991
3rd Called Session: January 2, 1992 - January 8, 1992
4th Called Session: November 10, 1992 - December 3, 1992

Party summary

Senate

House of Representatives

Officers

Senate
 Lieutenant Governor: Bob Bullock, Democrat
 President Pro Tempore (regular session): Bob Glasgow, Democrat	
 President Pro Tempore (1st called session): Don Henderson, Republican
 President Pro Tempore (2nd called session): Don Henderson, Republican
 President Pro Tempore (3rd called session): Bill Sims, Democrat
 President Pro Tempore (4th called session): Bill Sims, Democrat

House
 Speaker of the House: Gibson D. "Gib" Lewis, Democrat

Members

Senate

Sources
http://www.tsl.state.tx.us/ref/abouttx/holidays.html

http://www.lrl.state.tx.us/scanned/sessionOverviews/summary/soe70.pdf

External links

72nd Texas Legislature
1991 in Texas
1991 U.S. legislative sessions